Shane Patrick Ryan (born 27 January 1994) is an American-born swimmer who competes internationally for Ireland.

Career
Ryan was a 16-time All-American and 11-time All-State honoree as a swimmer for Haverford Senior High School. He was a member of the US National Junior Team in 2010-11 and 2011-12.

Ryan initially competed at the US Olympics trials in 2012, finishing in 28th, which did not qualify him for the US team. He subsequently switched his allegiance to Ireland. Ryan qualified to compete in the 2016 Summer Olympics by swimming under the Olympic Qualifying time in the 100m backstroke at the Swim Ulster Dave McCullagh Meet in March 2016.

College
Ryan competed collegiately for Penn State where he set school records in the 50 meter freestyle, 100 meter freestyle and 100 meter backstroke. He won Big Ten Conference championships in the 100 meter backstroke in 2014 and 2015 and the 100 meter freestyle in 2014.

International Swimming League 
In spring 2020, Ryan signed to the Toronto Titans, for their inaugural season; the first Canadian-based professional swim team.

World Championships 
In December 2018, Ryan won the bronze medal in the 50m backstroke at the 2018 World Short Course Swimming Championships.

At the 2016 Olympics, he made it out of the heats of the 100m backstroke to qualify for the semi-finals with a personal-best time of 53.85. He finished in last place in the semifinal.

Other 
In September 2017 at the 2017 University Games, Ryan won the Gold Medal in the 50m backstroke.	

In August 2018 at the 2018 European Championships, Ryan took bronze in the 50 m backstroke.

Personal life
Ryan's father, Thomas, emigrated from Portarlington, Co. Laois, in the 1980s; Ryan has Irish citizenship through him and can therefore swim under the Irish flag. His mother, Mary Beth Bonner, is also of Irish descent and won the Miss Mayo pageant in 1986. Ryan was raised in Havertown, Pennsylvania, and graduated with a degree in sports management at Penn State University.

See also
List of Pennsylvania State University Olympians

References

Living people
Olympic swimmers of Ireland
Swimmers at the 2016 Summer Olympics
Swimmers from Pennsylvania
People from Drexel Hill, Pennsylvania
1994 births
Universiade medalists in swimming
European Aquatics Championships medalists in swimming
Male backstroke swimmers
Irish male freestyle swimmers
Universiade gold medalists for Ireland
Medalists at the 2017 Summer Universiade
American male freestyle swimmers
Penn State Nittany Lions men's swimmers
Swimmers at the 2020 Summer Olympics